Cystidiodontia is a genus of toothed crust fungi in the family Cystostereaceae.

References

Cystostereaceae
Polyporales genera